The 1940 United States Senate election in Mississippi was held on November 6, 1940. Incumbent Senator Theodore Bilbo was re-elected to a second term.

On August 27, Bilbo won the Democratic primary election over Governor Hugh L. White with 59.32% of the vote. Bilbo won the November general election without an opponent.

Democratic primary

Candidates
Theodore Bilbo, incumbent Senator
Hugh L. White, Governor of Mississippi

Results

General election

Results

References

1940
Mississippi
United States Senate
Single-candidate elections